The 1990 season was the Hawthorn Football Club's 66th season in the newly named Australian Football League and 89th overall. Hawthorn entered the season as the two-time defending Premiers, having won back-to-back premierships.

Fixture

Premiership season

Finals series

Ladder

References

Hawthorn Football Club seasons